African Alliance Investment Bank (AAIB) is "an investment banking group" operating in Africa.

Location
The coordinates of the group's headquarters are:26°07'47.0"S, 28°04'12.0"E (Latitude:-26.129737; Longitude:28.070007).

Markets
, AAIB operates subsidiaries in the following markets:

Operations
In each of the markets that the bank serves, there is a locally registered subsidiary chaired by a non-executive chairman, an executive director, an executive committee, a risk committee, an audit committee, an internal auditor, a remuneration committee, a deal committee and a technical advisory committee. 

The group engages in the following activities:

See also
 Nairobi Securities Exchange
 Uganda Securities Exchange
 Rwanda Stock Exchange
 List of investment banks in Uganda
 List of investment banks in Kenya

References

External links
Official site

Investment management companies of South Africa
Companies based in Johannesburg
Financial services companies established in 1992
Banks established in 1992
South African companies established in 1992